Zyhdi Efendi Vlora was one of the signatories of the Albanian Declaration of Independence.

References

20th-century Albanian politicians
19th-century Albanian politicians